Klaus-Dieter Lehmann (born 29 February 1940 in Breslau) is a German librarian and has been president of the Goethe-Institut since April 2008.

Career
Born in 1940 in Breslau, Lehmann studied physics and mathematics and passed his state examination in library science.

In 1988 Lehmann became director of the Deutsche Bibliothek, Frankfurt, the national library of West Germany. Following German reunification he merged the library with its East German counterpart in Leipzig; since 2006, the institution has been known as the German National Library. From 1998 to 2008 he served as president of the Prussian Cultural Heritage Foundation.

Other activities

Corporate boards
 Deutsche Bank, member of the advisory board (since 2006) 
 Holtzbrinck Publishing Group, member of the supervisory board

Non-profits
 Association of Arts and Culture of the German Economy at the Federation of German Industries (BDI), member of the Jury for the 2017 Arts Sponsorship Award
 Bavarian State Library (BSB), member of the board of trustees
 Bertelsmann Stiftung, member of the board of trustees (2005–2010)
 BHF Bank Foundation, member of the board of trustees
 Culture Foundation of the German Football Association (DFB), member of the board of trustees
 Deutsches Museum, member of the governing board
 German Academic Exchange Service (DAAD), member of the executive committee
 Germanisches Nationalmuseum, chairman of the administrative board
 German Book Prize Academy, member of the executive board
 German-Russian Forum, member of the board of trustees
 Museum Berggruen, member of the international council
 Opera Village Africa, member of the Circle of Friends
 Villa Stuck, member of the board of trustees
 German Academy for Language and Literature, member of the board of trustees
 German Federal Cultural Foundation, chairman of the advisory committee
 Giesecke & Devrient Foundation, member of the board of trustees
 Heinz Friedrich Foundation, member of the board of trustees
 Peace Prize of the German Book Trade, member of the board of trustees (2008–2014)
 Cultural Foundation of the Federal States, deputy chairman of the board of trustees
 Stifterverband für die Deutsche Wissenschaft, member of the board of trustees
 Ursula Lübbe Foundation, member of the board of trustees
 2011 FIFA Women's World Cup, member of the board of trustees (2008–2011)
 Bertelsmann Foundation, member of the board of trustees (2006–2010)

Recognition
Lehmann was awarded the Federal Cross of Merit, First Class, in 1996. In 2016, he was awarded the Gutenberg Prize of the International Gutenberg Society and the City of Mainz.

References

External links

Goethe-Institut biography

1940 births
German librarians
Living people
Commanders Crosses of the Order of Merit of the Federal Republic of Germany
Recipients of the Order of Merit of Berlin
Members of the European Academy of Sciences and Arts